John Montagu, 2nd Duke of Montagu,  (1690 – 5 July 1749), styled Viscount Monthermer until 1705 and Marquess of Monthermer between 1705 and 1709, was a British peer.

Life
Montagu was an owner of a coal mine.

Montagu went on the grand tour with Pierre Sylvestre. On 17 March 1705, John was married to Lady Mary Churchill, daughter of John Churchill, 1st Duke of Marlborough, and Sarah Churchill, Duchess of Marlborough.

On 23 October 1717, Montagu was admitted a Fellow of the Royal College of Physicians. He was made a Knight of the Garter in 1719, and was made Order of the Bath, a Fellow of the Royal Society in 1725, and a Grand Master of the Premier Grand Lodge of England which was the first Masonic Grand Lodge to be created.

On 22 June 1722, George I appointed Montagu governor of the islands of Saint Lucia and Saint Vincent in the West Indies. He in turn appointed Nathaniel Uring, a merchant sea captain and adventurer, as deputy-governor. Uring went to the islands with a group of seven ships, and established settlement at Petit Carenage. Unable to get enough support from British warships, he and the new colonists were quickly run off by the French.

In 1739, the country's first home for abandoned children, the Foundling Hospital was created in London. Montagu was a supporter of this effort and was one of the charity's founding governors. He also financed the education of two notable Black British figures of the age, Ignatius Sancho (a butler at his Blackheath home, Montagu House) and Francis Williams, allegedly sending the latter to Cambridge University (the university has no record of his having studied there).

In 1745, Montagu raised a cavalry regiment known as Montagu's Carabineers, which, however, was disbanded after the Battle of Culloden.

Montagu was a notorious practical joker, his mother-in-law writing of him that "All his talents lie in things only natural in boys of fifteen years old, and he is about two and fifty; to get people into his garden and wet them with squirts, and to invite people to his country houses and put things in beds to make them itch, and twenty such pretty fancies as these."

Montagu is said to have once dunked the political philosopher Montesquieu in a tub of cold water as a joke.

Montagu's country place, Boughton House, Northamptonshire, was laid out by him as a miniature Versailles, and now belonging to the Buccleuch family.
After his death, his town residence, Montagu House, Bloomsbury, on the present site of the British Museum, received and for many years held the national collections, which under the name of the British Museum were first opened to the public in 1759.

Children

Montagu and his wife, Lady Mary Churchill, were parents to five children:

 Lady Isabella Montagu (d. 20 December 1786). Married first William Montagu, 2nd Duke of Manchester (no issue), and second Edward Hussey-Montagu, 1st Earl of Beaulieu (had issue).
 John (1706–1711)
 George (died in infancy)
 Lady Mary Montagu (c. 1711 – 1 May 1775). Married George Brudenell, 4th Earl of Cardigan (had issue).
 Edward (27 December 1725 – May 1727)

Succession
As none of Montagu's sons survived him, his titles became extinct upon his death in 1749.  His estates were inherited by his daughter Mary, whose husband, George Brudenell, 4th Earl of Cardigan assumed the name and arms of Montagu, and in 1766 was created 1st Duke of Montagu (second creation).  In 1790 this second creation dukedom of Montagu also became extinct; his only son (who had been created Baron Montagu of Boughton) having predeceased him. His daughter Elizabeth married Henry Scott, 3rd Duke of Buccleuch, 5th Duke of Queensberry who thus acquired all the unentailed property of the Dukes of Montagu.

Notes

Attribution

References

Bibliography
Murdoch, Tessa (ed.), Noble Households: Eighteenth-Century Inventories of Great English Houses (Cambridge, John Adamson, 2006)  . For an inventory of the duke's goods and chattels at Montagu House, Bloomsbury, prior to his move to Whitehall in 1733, see pp. 27–48; for an inventory of his goods and chattels at Montagu House, Whitehall, in 1746, see pp. 87–116, for inventories of his goods and chattels at Boughton House, see pp. 62–70 (1718) and pp. 70–7 (1730).

External links
 John Montague, 2nd Duke of Montagu presenting the Roll of Constitutions and the compasses to Philip, Duke of Wharton

1690 births
1749 deaths
2nd Dragoon Guards (Queen's Bays) officers
John Montagu, 02nd Duke of Montagu
British Life Guards officers
102
04
Fellows of the Royal Society
Knights of the Garter
Great Masters of the Order of the Bath
Lord-Lieutenants of Northamptonshire
Lord-Lieutenants of Warwickshire
Members of the Privy Council of Great Britain
Honourable Corps of Gentlemen at Arms
Freemasons of the Premier Grand Lodge of England
Grand Masters of the Premier Grand Lodge of England